Schizothorax huegelii is a species of ray-finned fish in the genus Schizothorax which is found in Jammu and Kashmir where it inhabits mountain streams and lakes.

References

Schizothorax
Fish described in 1838